Lester Justin Bartholomew (April 4, 1903 – September 19, 1972) was a pitcher in Major League Baseball. He played for the Pittsburgh Pirates and the Chicago White Sox. Bartholomew weighed 195 lbs, batted right-handed, and threw left-handed.

External links

1903 births
1972 deaths
Major League Baseball pitchers
Pittsburgh Pirates players
Chicago White Sox players
Columbia Comers players
Dallas Steers players
Omaha Crickets players
Omaha Packers players
Baseball players from Wisconsin
Sportspeople from Madison, Wisconsin